Shakargarh,  is a tehsil located in Narowal District, Punjab, Pakistan. Shakargarh was the only tehsil of Gurdaspur district which was included in Pakistan at the time of the independence in 1947. The literacy rate of Shakargarh is more than 97.6%, the highest in Pakistan. Pakistan Standard Time is referenced from Shakargarh.

Administration
The tehsil of Shakargarh is administratively subdivided into union councils, three of which form the tehsil capital Shakargarh. These are:

History
Shakargarh  became tehsil in 1853. It's literacy rate is 97 percent. Sialkot was annexed by the British after the Second Anglo-Sikh War in 1849. In 1853, Shakargarh Tehsil of Sialkot district was transferred to Gurdaspur District and it remained an administrative subdivision of Gurdaspur district until Partition in 1947. Under the Radcliffe Award, three of the four tehsils of Gurdaspur district on the eastern bank of the Ujh river (which joined the Ravi a little further down) –  Gurdaspur, Batala and Pathankot – were awarded to India and only one, Shakargarh, was assigned to Pakistan. After the creation of Pakistan, Shakargarh became a part of Sialkot district once again. In July 1991, two tehsils (Narowal and Shakargarh) were split off from Sialkot district and Shakargarh became a tehsil of the newly formed Narowal district.

The Imperial Gazetteer of India, written over a hundred years ago during British rule, describes Shakargarh as follows:

The Ravi divides it from the rest of the District to the south, while on the north it touches Jammu territory. West of the narrow lowlands along the Ravi, the country is an arid expanse of rolling downs intersected by torrent beds. The population in 1901 was 234,465, compared with 250,336 in 1891. It contains 703 villages, of which Shakargarh is the headquarters. The land revenue and cesses in 1903-4 amounted to Rs. 4,29,000.

Demographics

Famous people
Anwer Aziz
 Danyal Aziz : former member of National Assembly of Islamic Republic of Pakistan.

 Nek Chand : Indian sculptor and creator of Rock Garden, Chandigarh
 Dev Anand : Indian Bollywood actor
 S M Zafar : former minister, human rights lawyer in Pakistan
 Shiv Kumar Batalvi : Punjabi poet.
  Dr. Naimat Ali Javaid: Nuclear scientist, Former District Nazim.
  Chaudhary Ali Gujjar of Naimat pur shakargarh. Chairman 
  Chaudhry Abdul Rahim : Founder of Govt G D Islamia higher secondary school MaingariHigh school, Nurkot, Maingari.
  Chaudhry Abdul Ghafoor Qamar : 
Ex. MLA British India.
  Dr. Riaz Ahmad: Graduate of KEMC
1957, established first Hospital in Private sector.

References

External links
 Shakargarh Official Website : https://shakargarh.net

Narowal District
Tehsils of Punjab, Pakistan